Poola Rangadu is a 1967 Indian Telugu-language crime thriller film, produced by  D. Madhusudhana Rao under Annapurna Pictures and directed by Adurthi Subba Rao and produced by D. Madhusudhana Rao. It stars Akkineni Nageswara Rao, Jamuna, Sobhan Babu, Vijaya Nirmala, and music composed by S. Rajeswara Rao. The film, loosely based on A. J. Cronin's novel Beyond This Place, was released on 24 November and became a box office success. It was remade in Tamil in 1970 as En Annan and in Hindi in 1972 as Jeet.

Plot 
Ranga Rao is a carefree jovial person and is better known as Poola Rangadu. He makes a living pulling horse carts and is in love with Venkatalakshmi. When both he and his sister were children, their father Veerayya used to work as a manager at a mill, owned by Purushotham. Purushotham was murdered by his business partners Dharma Rao and Chalapathi. Veerayya is framed by them and is sentenced to life imprisonment leaving his children completely helpless. Despite hardships, Ranga has managed to raise his sister Padma with great care and loves her very much. Venkatalakshmi's no-good brother, Narasimhulu, has an eye for Padma, but she falls in love with Dr. Prasad. Ranga gets her married to the doctor. However, he happens to be the son of Purushotham. A vengeful Narasimhulu uses the fact that Padma is Purushotham's alleged murderer Veerayya's daughter to poison her mother-in-law against her who promptly throws the now pregnant Padma out of the house. Ranga becomes furious at this and beats up Narasimhulu. This ends up getting Ranga arrested and he is sent to prison for a year. In jail, Ranga bumps into his father who tells him about how he was framed. Once his one year sentence is up, Ranga decides to prove his father's innocence at all cost. With this intention, he makes his way into Dharma Rao's house where he cleverly stirs up trouble between Dharma Rao and Chalapathi. Through various schemes, Ranga finally manages to prove his father's innocence. Padma is reunited with her husband and Ranga marries Venkatalakshmi.

Cast 
Akkineni Nageswara Rao as Ranga Rao
Jamuna as Venkata Lakshmi
Sobhan Babu as Dr. Prasad
Vijaya Nirmala as Padma
V. Nagayya as Veeraiah
Gummadi as Dharma Rao
Allu Ramalingaiah as Police Punaiah
Padmanabham as Bujji
Chalam as Narasimhulu
Bhanu Prakash as Chalapathi
Suryakantham as Baby
Malathi as Prasad's mother
Geetanjali as Lilly
Radha Kumari as Punaiah's wife

Production 
Producer D. Madhusudhana Rao sought to work on the adaptation of the A. J. Cronin novel Beyond This Place, on the suggestion of Gollapudi Maruti Rao. He hired Mullapudi Venkata Ramana to write the story taking a basic plot point from the novel while Ranganayakamma provided the dialogues. Prisons scenes were shot at real locations at Chanchalguda and Musheerabad Central Prisons in Hyderabad with the permission of the state government. Though the film was predominantly filmed in black-and-white, the "Nee Jilugu Paita" song sequence alone was in colour.

Soundtrack 
The music was composed by S. Rajeswara Rao.

Release and reception 
Griddaluru Gopalrao of Zamin Ryot, in his review dated 1 December 1967, criticised the film for its poor direction and performances. The film ran for more than 100 days in 11 centres in Andhra Pradesh.

Awards 
 Mullapudi Venkata Ramana won the Nandi Award for Second Best Story Writer (1967).

References

External links 
 

1960s crime thriller films
1967 films
Films about miscarriage of justice
Films based on works by A. J. Cronin
Films directed by Adurthi Subba Rao
Films scored by S. Rajeswara Rao
Films set in India
Films set in prison
Films shot in Hyderabad, India
Indian black-and-white films
Indian crime thriller films
Telugu films remade in other languages